Powderhorn may refer to:

 Powderhorn, Minneapolis, a community in Minneapolis, Minnesota, U.S.
 Powderhorn Park, Minneapolis, a neighborhood in Minneapolis, Minnesota, U.S.
 Powderhorn Resort, a ski resort in Colorado, U.S.
 Powderhorn Wilderness, a wilderness area in Hinsdale and Gunnison counties, Colorado, U.S.
 Powderhorn, Colorado, an unincorporated community in Gunnison County, Colorado, U.S.

See also
Big Powderhorn Mountain
Powder Horn (disambiguation)